Mauricette Geller (born 28 March 1973) is a Belgian gymnast. She competed in five events at the 1988 Summer Olympics.

References

1973 births
Living people
Belgian female artistic gymnasts
Olympic gymnasts of Belgium
Gymnasts at the 1988 Summer Olympics
Sportspeople from Liège